"Ständchen" (known in English by its first line "Hark, hark, the lark"),  889, is a lied for solo voice and piano by Franz Schubert, composed in July 1826 in the then village of Währing. It is a setting of the "Song" in act 2, scene 3 of Shakespeare's Cymbeline. The song was first published by Anton Diabelli in 1830, two years after the composer's death.

Song title
In German translations of Cymbeline, the short lyric which Schubert set to music is simply titled Lied (Song). Schubert's title, "Ständchen", is usually translated into English as Serenade. The words of the poem, and its context within the play, indicate that is unquestionably to be sung in the morning: if there were any doubt, the lines which immediately precede the text of the 'Song' include this snippet of dialogue:
Cloten: It's almost morning, is't not?
First Lord: Day, my lord.

The German word Ständchen is unspecific about the time of the homage. As others have pointed out, and as Furness in his 'Variorum Edition' of Cymbeline makes abundantly clear, "This present song is the supreme crown of all aubades..." The Schirmer edition of Liszt's transcription for solo piano clarifies the context with the title of Morgenständchen (morning serenade), and the German title of Schubert's song would be more accurately rendered in English as Aubade.

History 
This 'Ätherblau' version was published in 1812 under the names of A. W. Schlegel and J. J. Eschenburg, and then in at least four slightly differing printings of the 'Vienna Shakespeare Editions' in 1825 and 1826, with and without Schlegel's name on the title-page.

A story about the song's creation was recounted by a boyhood friend of Schubert to the composer's biographer, Heinrich Kreissle von Hellborn in his Life of Franz Schubert. The whole party determined on a halt in their journey. Tieze had a book lying open before him, and Schubert soon began to turn over the leaves. Suddenly he stopped, and pointing to a poem, exclaimed, "Such a delicious melody has just come into my head, if I but had a sheet of music-paper with me." Herr Doppler drew a few music lines on the back of a bill-of-fare, and in the midst of a genuine Sunday hubbub, with fiddlers, skittle players, and waiters running about in different directions with orders, Schubert wrote that lovely song.

Maurice Brown, in his critical biography of Schubert, partially debunks the story, showing that the garden of the "Zum Biersack" in Währing was next door to that of the poet Franz von Schober, and that Schubert spent some time there in the summer of 1826 with the painter Moritz von Schwind, although not necessarily staying overnight more than once or twice. Brown thinks that Doppler may have been confused about the place where the incident took place. Brown in his book only mentions Titze twice in passing, however, and not in connection with the story of the menu.

The earliest surviving Schubert autograph manuscript (MS) is in the Wienbibliothek im Rathaus. It consists of four Lieder (of which the "Ständchen" is the second) in a pocket-sized MS book with staves hand-ruled by Schubert.  At of the top of the first page, in Schubert's hand, is written: Währing, July 1826, followed by his signature.
 "Trinklied", D888  – (Antony & Cleopatra, act 2, scene 7 – trans. Eduard Bauernfeld & Ferdinand Mayrhofer von Grünbühel)
 "Ständchen", D889 ("Hark, hark, the lark") – (Cymbeline, act 2, scene 3 – possibly not trans. by Schlegel)
 "Hippolits Lied", D890 – by Friedriech von Gerstenberg
 Gesang, D891 ("Was ist Sylvia?") – (Two Gentlemen of Verona, act 4, scene 2 – trans. Bauernfeld alone)

Lied
Schubert set the lied in the key of C major.

Text

The German translation that Schubert set has the same metre/rhythm as Shakespeare's lyric, which allows the music to be sung to the original English words.

Music

Reception
Schubert's biographer John Reed (1909–1999) says that the song "celebrates the universality of two of the world's greatest song-writers." Richard Capell in his survey of Schubert's songs, called the Ständchen "very pretty" but "a trifle overrated [...] the song is hardly one to be very fond of. Not a lifetime of familiarity with it can bridge the gap that yawns between the Elizabethan's verse and the Austrian's tune." On the other hand, while discussing the variorum readings of Shakespeare's play, Howard Furness refers to "the version which Schubert sets to peerless music", and Sir George Grove describes how "that beautiful song, so perfectly fitting the words, and so skilful and happy in its accompaniment, came into perfect existence."

Publication
Schubert's song was published posthumously as "" in part seven of Diabelli's first edition of Schubert's songs . See § Ex. 2 above. The text of Schubert's autograph is exactly reproduced in the first published edition of the song , except for some very minor punctuation. Fair autograph copies of two of the four songs in the Vienna Library MS ("Trinklied" and "Was ist Silvia?") are held in the Hungarian National Library (National Széchényi Library).

Both the Breitkopf & Härtel edition of 1894–95, and in the Peters edition for low voice credit A. W. Schlegel with the words. Otto Deutsch in his 1951 Schubert Thematic Catalogue entry for D889 also gives "deutsch von August Wilhelm Schlegel", with no further details.

Arrangements
"Ständchen" has been arranged for various instrumental combinations, including Franz Liszt's transcription for solo piano, published by Diabelli in 1838 as no. 9, "Ständchen von Shakespeare", of his 12 Lieder von Franz Schubert, S.558.

Notes

References

Sources
   
 
 
 
 
 
 
 
 
 
 
  (For Horace, see )
 
 
 
  was reprinted in (C90. Mehrer Verfassen)
  Volume 1 Volume 2
 
 

 
 
 
  The actual page:
 
 
 
 
  Title page, p. 125

External links
D 889 Ständchen: digital facsimile of 1st edition at 
Horch! horch! die Lerch' im Ätherblau at The LiederNet Archive website.

Lieder composed by Franz Schubert
Compositions by Franz Schubert published posthumously
Compositions in C major
1826 compositions
Music based on works by William Shakespeare